MG Motor UK Limited (MG Motor) is an automotive company owned by SAIC Motor UK, headquartered in London, owned by the Shanghai-based Chinese state-owned automaker SAIC Motor. MG Motor designs, develops and markets cars sold under the British MG marque, while vehicle manufacturing takes place at its plants in China, Thailand, and India. The design of the cars was originally engineered by MG Motors in the Longbridge plant in Birmingham, but now most of the design, development and R&D takes place in SMTC labs, London.

History
Following the collapse of MG Rover Group in 2005, the Chinese automaker Nanjing Automobile acquired the Longbridge plant and the MG marque for £53 million ($97 million). Nanjing Automobile formally established NAC MG UK Limited as a holding company for the plant and marque on 12 April 2006. In March 2007, Nanjing Automobile unveiled the first MG vehicles manufactured in China, the MG TF, MG 3 and MG 7.

Cars were assembled once again at Longbridge with production of the MG TF LE500 between August 2007 and September 2016.

In 2007, Nanjing Automobile was acquired by SAIC Motor, and in early 2009 NAC MG UK Limited was renamed MG Motor UK Limited.

The first all-new MG-branded model for 16 years, the MG6, was officially launched on 26 June 2011 during a visit to MG Motor's Longbridge plant by Chinese premier Wen Jiabao.

By March 2012, SAIC had invested a total of £450 million in MG Motor. Sales in the UK totalled 782 vehicles in 2012. The MG3 went on sale in the United Kingdom in September 2013.

MG Motor was voted third place for the 'Best Manufacturer' category in the Auto Express 2014 Driver Power survey. 2014 also saw MG Motor celebrate the MG brand's 90th birthday. They enjoyed further celebrations with a record-breaking year that saw the company lead UK car industry growth in 2014. The brand's sales rose by 361% during 2014 part thanks to the introduction of the MG3 to the product range, with a total of 2,326 cars sold in the UK.

During 2014, MG was the fastest-growing brand in Britain as shown by official figures issued by the Society of Motor Manufacturers and Traders. Currently, MG Motor has the fastest-growing network of dealers in the UK.

On 23 September 2016 MG Motor announced that all car production had ceased at Longbridge and henceforth MG vehicles would be imported into the UK.

In 2018, SAIC Design opened a new advanced design studio in London, which deals with the advanced design of MG and Roewe vehicles.

Operations

Facilities
MG Motor continued to assemble cars at the historic Longbridge plant until 2016 when production ended, but retained a large technical centre known as SAIC Motor Technical Centre which employed around 500 people at its peak, together with a design studio. SAIC further reduced its presence in Longbridge in 2019 with the large Technical Centre downsized to 20 staff and moved to London.
 
Formerly home to Austin, British Leyland, Rover Group and, later, the MG Rover Group. MG has a £30 million flagship dealership in the heart of London's Piccadilly, which was opened in July 2015. Its location is 47–48 Piccadilly, opposite the historic Fortnum & Mason store.

MG Motors now has dealers across Australia and New Zealand.

Development
MG vehicles were primarily designed in United Kingdom between 2005 and 2019, with a reduced UK input since then. Longbridge has been retained and Research and Development is currently undertaken at the Longbridge Facility, with Longbridge being home to SMTC (SAIC Motor Technical Centre), which has significant design and engineering input into SAIC products globally.

MG has headquarters in United Kingdom, with production in China, Thailand (from 2016) and India (since 2019) but the primary design was held at the Longbridge, Birmingham headquarter. Studio is based in a newly renovated building in the heart of London on the Marylebone Road. The new creative space is SAIC first facility, to specialise in Advanced Digital Design Technology, and will work in conjunction with the automotive manufacturer's other studios to support future product designs for brands including MG and Roewe. Advanced London is the second SAIC Motor design studio to be established in Europe, following the studio in Longbridge, which opened in 2011. The London Design Studio will focus more on advanced design research projects and creative exploration of conceptual ideas. London makes use of advanced virtual reality technology to design vehicles, which allows for the designers to fully immerse themselves into the design concepts, greatly improving the level of detail at which ideas can be reviewed before they are turned into more costly physical models. Using state-of-the-art functions such as this will allow Advanced London to explore innovative design concepts, broadening design possibilities." Advanced London is managed by SAIC Design European Advanced Design Director, Carl Gotham.

Production
After MG Rover collapsed, Nanjing Automobile continued production at the Longbridge plant. Nanjing used Longbridge to produce the MG TF, which they mildly redeveloped.

SAIC took ownership of the MG brand, and from 2010 onwards, the newly released MG 6 was produced in China. However, from 13 April 2011, MG Motor produced the MG 6 at Longbridge. From 2013, the MG 3 also saw some limited final assembly at the same factory.

Activity at Longbridge was gradually reduced. It was announced in September 2016 that production at the Longbridge facility was to be stopped in 2016 and moved to China, with Matthew Cheyne, head of sales and marketing at MG Motor UK, citing "moving production abroad was a necessary business decision". Twenty-five employees were made redundant as a result of the move and other employees moved to different areas. This marked the end of MG production in the UK, and production was fully moved to China, with later a factory in Thailand.

In 2019 MG Motor was set to open a fourth factory in China, in Ningde, Fujian Province. The factory will specialise in producing electric vehicles, with the new all-electric production sports car being produced at the factory. MG and Roewe's upcoming SUV, codenamed IS 32 (MG) and IS 31 (Roewe), are also set to be produced at the factory.

Products

Current models 

 MG 3 — A supermini. 
 MG 4 EV (Europe and China) — A compact hatchback. 
 MG 5 — A compact sedan and hatchback. 
 MG 6 — A compact sports sedan. 
 MG 7 — A mid-size sports sedan.
 MG ZS — A compact crossover. 
 MG HS — A compact crossover. 
 MG One — A compact crossover. 
 MG Hector — A compact crossover based on the Baojun 530.
 MG Gloster (India) — A mid-size ladder frame SUV based on the Maxus D90. 
 MG RX5 — A compact crossover based on the Roewe RX5. 
 MG RX8 — A mid-size crossover based on the Roewe RX8. 
 MG V80 — A light commercial van based on the Maxus V80.
 MG Extender — A mid-size pickup truck based on the Maxus T70.

Former models 

 MG GS
 MG GT
 MG TF
 MG3 SW

Concept models

 MG Icon — An SUV concept unveiled at the Beijing Auto Show in 2012.
 MG CS — An SUV concept that was unveiled at the Shanghai Motor Show in 2013. 
 MG EV — An electric supermini based on the Roewe E50, unveiled in 2014.
 MG E-Motion —  An electric sports car concept unveiled at the Shanghai Motor Show in 2017.
 MG X-Motion — An SUV concept unveiled at the Beijing Motor Show 2018, previewed the MG HS.

Motorsport 

In January 2012, MG Motor announced that it would enter the 2012 British Touring Car Championship through the newly established MG KX Momentum Racing team. In its debut season the team ran two MG6s driven by Jason Plato and Andy Neate. Plato ended the season in third place, with the car yet to find its feet in wet conditions.

The team returned in 2013 with Sam Tordoff driving, who performed well in his debut year having joined through the KX Academy scheme. Plato once again came third, with Tordoff sixth.

In 2014, MG won the Manufacturer's Championship to break Honda's four-year reign. After just three years of competition, the MG6 GT sealed the title by 95 points at the season finale at Brands Hatch.

Drivers Plato and Tordoff racked up seven wins and 20 podiums in the 30-race calendar. Plato finished the Driver's Championship in second place, behind Colin Turkington, while Tordoff finished seventh. The 2014 season also saw a third MG6 GT on the grid, driven by Marc Hynes and also maintained by Triple Eight but in a new livery which did not resemble the other two MG cars. Hynes finished his debut season in 18th.

For the 2015 campaign MG fought to regain the Manufacturers / Constructors title with a new driver lineup. 2013 Champion Andrew Jordan and young gun Jack Goff paired up in the MG6 to fight against Honda, BMW and Infiniti for the title. MG finished second in the Manufacturers / Constructors title challenge, with Andrew and Jack in fifth and ninth position, respectively, in the drivers' standings.

MG announced a new three-year contract extension with Triple Eight Racing for the 2016 BTCC campaign. The team plan was to bring in young and up-and-coming drivers with an intention to grow its own champion over the duration of the contract. Josh Cook, a former 2014 Renault UK Clio Cup Vice-Champion, and BTCC 2015 Jack Sears Trophy winner (award for the top rookie) and Ashley Sutton, graduating to BTCC after leaving the Renault Clio Cup as reigning 2015 champion, were announced as the new line up for MG. After a hard-fought campaign the MG drivers finished in 12th and 13th place, respectively, with Ash picking up the Jack Sears Trophy for the top rookie.

Another new driver lineup was introduced for the 2017 season as Árón Taylor-Smith and Daniel Lloyd drove the MG6 cars. The season was a disaster, with not a single win or podium finish to show for their efforts. Lloyd left the team after four meetings and Josh Cook was brought back to help improve results, whilst Taylor-Smith was withdrawn from the Croft rounds of the championship after being involved in a multi-car accident during the wet qualifying session at the circuit, the Irishman struggled thereafter, picking up just six further points all season. Cook was ultimately the highest placed of the MG drivers in the championship, but only in 18th (that includes the points he obtained when driving for Maximum Motorsport before returning to MG), and the team finished a distant last in the manufacturers standings.

Triple Eight merged their operations with BMR Racing for 2018, and therefore MG exited the championship again as a manufacturer. The MG6 continued to be used for a further two seasons, firstly by AmD Tuning in 2018, and then by Excelr8 Motorsport in 2019, with rather limited success in both years.

Sales numbers

See also
 List of car manufacturers of the United Kingdom

References

External links
 

 
Car manufacturers of the United Kingdom
Luxury motor vehicle manufacturers
Vehicle manufacturing companies established in 2006
2006 establishments in England